The Million Colour Revolution is the second studio album by Spanish alternative pop band The Pinker Tones. It was released on 7 February 2006 through Nacional Records in the United States and Outstanding Records in the United Kingdom.

Track listing
All tracks written by The Pinker Tones.

Usage in media
 "Señoras y Señores" and "Welcome to TMCR" were featured in the final season of Ugly Betty.
 First single, "Sonido Total" appeared in Forza Motorsport 2, 1st season of Ugly Betty, English as a Second Language, Dj Nino remix version in the 4th season of Entourage (7th episode), The Border, 2007 TV series of Flash Gordon ("Ascension"), and Nick & Norah's Infinite Playlist.
 Second single, "Karma Hunters" appeared in the soundtrack of Forza Motorsport 2, Efectos secundarios and The Chicas Project.
 Their song "Beyond Nostalgia" appeared in The Chicas Project along with "Karma Hunters". It also appeared in Russian film, Newsmakers.
 Their song, "L'heros" appeared as soundtrack in the 2008 TV series of Privileged (3rd episode).
 Their song, "Pink freud" was used in Kia Motors TV commercial.
 Third single,  "Love Tape" was featured in Flash Gordon.
 Their song were featured in Project Gotham Racing 4, English as a Second Language, Snow Gods and 2007 TV series of Flash Gordon (Life Source) with "In Pea We Nuts".
 Their final single "TMCR Grand Finale" featured as soundtrack in EA Sports video game, FIFA 07 also in La mujer de mi hermano and Snow Gods.

2005 albums
The Pinker Tones albums